Hrebinka is a city in Poltava Oblast, Ukraine. It is the administrative center of Hrebinka Raion. Population: 
First, a new railway station was built near the village of Horodyshche, which was named Hrebinka in honor of the Ukrainian writer who was born nearby, in the village of Maryanivka.

Gallery

References 

Cities in Poltava Oblast
Piryatinsky Uyezd
Cities of district significance in Ukraine